Gurchan may refer to:
 Gurchan, Markazi
 Gurchan, Sistan and Baluchestan